'Pastore Peak is a mountain that is located in the Karakoram region of Pakistan close to China border, near famous K2 mountain. While it is considered an easy “trekking peak” during summer climbing season, the winter ascend is very challenging even for experience climber.

References

Mountains of Gilgit-Baltistan
Mountains of Xinjiang
China–Pakistan border
International mountains of Asia